is a railway station on the Hakone Tozan Line in Hakone, Kanagawa, Japan.

Lines
The station lies 6.1 kilometers from the line's official starting point at Odawara Station. Odakyu Electric Railway "Romancecar" limited express trains run between Shinjuku and this station.

Station layout
The station has four tracks. There are some shops, information center for sightseeing and hotel reservations, and bus terminal also in front of the station.

Platforms

History

Hakone-Yumoto station opened on 1 October 1888, as "Odawara Horse-drawn Railway" terminal Yumoto Station, from Kōzu Station (on the Tokaido Main Line), via Odawara Station.

Since 1950, Odakyu Electric Railway provides through services from Shinjuku Station on its Odawara Line, by Limited Express "Romancecar" and Express (commuter trains). After 15 March 2008, Odakyu discontinued normal Express services on the Hakone Tozan Line. A new station building was completed in 2009.

Station numbering was introduced in January 2014 with Hakone-Yumoto being assigned station number OH51.

Bus services
Buses are operated by several companies.
Bus stop No.1 (Izuhakone Bus)
"Z" line for Hakone Checkpoint (Lake Ashi) via Miyanoshita, Kowakidani Station, Kowaki-en, Moto Hakone (Hakone Shrine)
"J" line for Hakone-en (Lake Ashi) via Miyanoshita, Kowakidani Station, Kowaki-en, Ōwakudani, Kojiri
Bus stop No.2 (Hakone Tozan Bus)
"H" line for Hakone Machi Ko (Lake Ashi) via Miyanoshita, Kowakidani Station, Kowaki-en, Moto Hakone Ko (Hakone Shrine: Transfer for Sightseeing Cruise), Hakone Checkpoint
Bus stop No.3 (Hakone Tozan Bus)
"T" line for Togendai (Lake Ashi: Transfer for Sightseeing Cruise) via Miyanoshita, Venetian Glass Museum, Sengoku (Transfer for Gotemba Premium Outlets and JR Gotemba Station; a gateway station for Mount Fuji and Fuji Five Lakes, including Lake Kawaguchi and Lake Yamanaka), Kawamukai (The Little Prince and Saint-Exupéry Museum), Senkyoro-mae (Transfer for Pola Museum of Art), Sengoku-kogen (Pampas grass viewing spot)
Bus stop No.4
"K" line for Moto Hakone Ko (Hakone Shrine: Transfer for Sightseeing Cruise) via Hatajuku (Hakone Tozan Bus)
"D" line for Haneda Airport via Yokohama Station (Odakyu Hakone Highway Bus & Keikyu Bus)
Bus stop No.5 (All buses)
for Odawara Station
Bus stop No.6 (Hakone tozan Bus)
for Gora Station via Miyanoshita, Kowakidani Station and Chōkoku-no-Mori Station

See also
 List of railway stations in Japan

References

External links

 Hakone Tozan Railway official website
 Hakone Tozan Bus official website (Hakone Yumoto Station)
 Hakone-Yumoto Station Map (Hakone Navi)

Railway stations in Japan opened in 1919
Railway stations in Kanagawa Prefecture
Buildings and structures in Hakone, Kanagawa